2007 Japanese Super Cup was the Japanese Super Cup competition. The match was played at National Stadium in Tokyo on February 24, 2007. Gamba Osaka won the championship.

Match details

References

Japanese Super Cup
2007 in Japanese football
Urawa Red Diamonds matches
Gamba Osaka matches